Berengaria of Castile (Seville, 1253 – Guadalajara, 1300), Infanta of Castile and Lady of Guadalajara in her own right. She was the eldest child of King Alfonso X of Castile and Violante of Aragon. She was probably named after her paternal great-grandmother, Queen Berengaria of Castile.

As the first-born daughter, she was the heiress to the throne until the birth of her brother, the Infante Fernando de la Cerda. Her paternal grandparents were King Ferdinand III of Castile and his first wife Elisabeth of Swabia and her maternal grandparents were King James I of Aragon and his second wife Yolande of Hungary.

Life
Berengaria was born in Seville at the end of 1253, and her first years were spent in that city, being cared for by a noble named Don Romero. In the Cortes of Toledo in 1254 she was recognized as heir presumptive due to the lack of male descent from King Alfonso X. In the fall of 1254, Queen Violante gave birth a second daughter, Beatrice, prompting Alfonso X to consider the possibility that his eldest daughter Berengaria might become queen regnant. For this reason, he began negotiations to marry her with Louis, eldest son and heir of King Louis IX of France.

On 5 May 1255 there was a plenary assembly in Palencia of the different estates, whose objective was to confirm Berengaria as heir presumptive. On 23 October 1255, however, her brother Ferdinand was born. As a son, he displaced Berengaria in the line of succession and became the heir apparent. The betrothal between Berengaria and Louis of France (signed by contract in Paris on 20 August 1255)  established in the city of Palencia. However, the union never took place because the young Louis died on 11 January 1260.

In the codicil of the will of Alfonso X, drawn up on 10 January 1284, three months before his death, the monarch confirmed to his eldest daughter Berengaria, who held the Lordship of Guadalajara, the possession of all the goods that he had previously granted her and that her brother, the future King Sancho IV had taken from her. Alfonso X also ordered in his codicil that if Berengaria did not recover her possessions, the income from Écija and Jerez de la Frontera be granted to her, or the amount of the rents of one of those two cities, located in the rents of Seville, providing at the same time that when the infanta died, the rents should be received by her brother, the infante John of Castile, Lord of Valencia de Campos, to whom Alfonso X had granted in his testament the Kingdom of Seville, or his heirs.

Berengaria, who according to some sources rejected the marriage proposal of the Sultan of Egypt, because he wasn't a Christian, entered as a nun in the Abbey of Santa María la Real de Las Huelgas of Burgos, founded by King Alfonso VIII of Castile with the purpose of turning it into the necropolis of the Castilian royal family.

Various sources indicate that Berengaria died in the city of Guadalajara in 1300, while others maintain that she died in the Monastery of San Clemente in Seville, where the infanta was supposedly transferred in 1303 by the will of her nephew, King Ferdinand IV of Castile.

Sepulture
There is controversy about the whereabouts of Berengaria's mortal remains, since there are three places which currently claimed to be the place of her burial. In the Convent of Santa Clara of Toro, founded by Berengaria, there is a wooden urn, held aloft by three lions, on one side of the main chapel of the church, and in the center of the wooden urn are painted the royal arms, and sides are written the following verses:

A privilege granted by King John II of Castile to the Convent of Santa Clara of Toro, confirms that in this convent were place Berengaria's remains, as well as the authentication of the remains deposited inside the urn, which were examined in 1772. However, there are documents that indicate that her remains were later transferred to the disappeared Monastery of Santo Domingo el Real in Madrid, to which she had donated the city of Guadalajara. In 1869, before the demolition of the Monastery of Santo Domingo, a witness saw, located in front of the tomb that contained the remains of infanta Constance, daughter of Ferdinand IV, who was also buried in the monastery, a tombstone which contained the following inscription:

The niche that contained the mortal remains in the Monastery of Santo Domingo el Real in Madrid was opened on 23 April 1869, with those present testifying that "the corpse has also been found, also mummified, with a very curious headdress and wrapped in luxurious silk clothing". Once the remains were examined, they were again deposited in their niche, but when the building was demolished in 1869, the mortal remains of both infantas Berengaria and Constance were transferred to the crypt of the Church of San Antonio de los Alemanes in Madrid, where they currently rest.

Notwithstanding all of the above, others sources stated that Berengaria was inhumed in the Royal Monastery of San Clemente in Seville, where Queen María of Portugal, wife of King Alfonso XI of Castile and mother of King Peter, was also buried.

Ancestry

References

Bibliography

External links
 Ficha genealógica de la infanta Berenguela de Castilla, hija de Alfonso X el Sabio. Fundación Casa ducal de Medinaceli (in Spanish)
  Iglesia de San Antonio de los Alemanes (in Spanish)

1253 births
1300 deaths
Castilian infantas
Berengaria
13th-century women rulers
13th-century Spanish women
13th-century Castilians
Daughters of kings